Bournemouth East was the first railway station to be built in Bournemouth, England. Completed on 14 March 1870, it was sited at the south-east side of the Holdenhurst Road bridge, opposite the current station, at the end of an extension of an existing branch from Ringwood to Christchurch which had originally opened on 13 November 1862. The facilities offered by this station were very basic and not befitting a wealthy town which by 1871 had reached 5,900 inhabitants. The second station in the town, Bournemouth West, opened on 20 July 1874, and it was a far more substantial affair at the end of a new branch from Poole.

It was closed and replaced by the new Bournemouth East station, on the opposite (north-west) side of the Holdenhurst Road bridge, on 20 July 1885.

The site today
The site is used for a warehouse store.

References

Disused railway stations in Bournemouth
Railway stations in Great Britain opened in 1870
Railway stations in Great Britain closed in 1885
Former London and South Western Railway stations
1870 establishments in England
1885 disestablishments in England